Empresa Aeronáutica Ypiranga, commonly shortened to EAY, was a Brazilian aircraft manufacturer based in São Paulo and founded in 1931 by American Orton Hoover, Brazilian Henrique Dumont Villares and German Fritz Roesler.

History
In 1914, Orton Hoover came to Brazil to assemble three Curtiss-Wright seaplanes purchased by the Brazilian Navy. He settled permanently in Brazil in 1928 and worked with Federico Brotero on the development of the IPT Bichinho a single-seat sport aircraft. Henrique Dumont Villares was the nephew of Alberto Santos Dumont and Fritz Roesler was a German fighter pilot in World War I before going to Brazil. Roesler founded a flight school near São Paulo in 1923 and, together with George Coubisier, Francisco Matarazzo and others, the VASP airline.

Empresa Aeronáutica Ypiranga began operations with the production of the EAY-101 glider, a copy of the Stamer Lippisch Zögling, of which six were built. The second aircraft model EAY-201 was a copy of the Taylor Cub. The EAY-201 was a two-seat trainer aircraft and first flew in 1935, with only five examples built. EAY was then acquired by Companhia Aeronáutica Paulista in 1942. The EAY-201 now continued in production as the CAP-4 Paulistinha.

Aircraft

See also
 Companhia Aeronáutica Paulista
 Indústria Aeronáutica Neiva

References

Glider manufacturers
Defunct aircraft manufacturers of Brazil
Manufacturing companies based in São Paulo
Brazilian brands